Alicja Tchórz (born 13 August 1992) is a Polish swimmer. She competed at the 2012 Summer Olympics in the Women's 100 metre backstroke, finishing in 25th place in the heats, failing to qualify for the semifinals. She competed at the 2016 Summer Olympics in the Women's 100 metre backstroke.

In 2017, she competed at The World Games in 2017 in Lifesaving, where she won a silver and a bronze medal.

Alicja was part of the New York Breakers for the season 2 of the International Swimming League in 2020.

In 2021, she won gold medal in the 100m medley at the 2021 European Short Course Swimming Championships in Kazan, Russia.

References

External links
 
 
 
 
 
 

1992 births
Living people
Polish female backstroke swimmers
Olympic swimmers of Poland
Sportspeople from Kalisz
Swimmers at the 2012 Summer Olympics
Swimmers at the 2016 Summer Olympics
World Games gold medalists
World Games silver medalists
World Games bronze medalists
Competitors at the 2017 World Games
Competitors at the 2022 World Games
Polish lifesaving athletes
20th-century Polish women
21st-century Polish women